Gareth Morgan is a former editor of UK tabloid newspaper the Daily Star Sunday.

He became editor of the newspaper in December 2003, taking over from Hugh Whittow. Within four years he made the Daily Star Sunday Britain's fastest growing national newspaper. Once he said in an interview that this is the nicest job a man could wish for.

References

Daily Star Sunday people
English newspaper editors
English male journalists
Living people
Year of birth missing (living people)